Apple Sidra is a Taiwanese cola which was first distributed in 1965. The drink prides itself in the fact that the drink is made without any preservatives or artificial flavors. It's manufactured by Oceanic Beverages Co., Inc. and is mainly distributed in Taiwan. The drink has a sweet natural apple flavor to it with a bit of citrus. It's sold in 250 and 330 ml cans, 275 ml glass bottles, and 600 ml, 1250 ml, and 2 liter bottles.

History 
Apple Sidra was first conceptualized in 1963 and then produced in 1965 with the help of Taiwanese investors from the Philippines and the U.S. It was introduced to the Philippines in 1969 where it was sold in solid glass bottles. The drink was never really popular until the 1970's. It was first made in three-piece aluminium cans, though in 1981 they became one of the first drinks in Asia to use the new two-piece can designs. Today, Apple Sidra is mainly exported to Taiwan, though it is available in other countries in niche stores for soft drinks.

Safety problems 
In 2019, Oceanic Beverages started getting complaints of contaminants being found in the two liter bottles of Apple Sidra. This led them to recall 1.2 million bottles of Apple Sidra because of a contamination in them. The contamination was suspected to be because of a sterilization failure in their factories. Around 80,000 two liter bottles produced between July 4 and July 18, 2018 are believed to have been contaminated according to Oceanic Beverages. The company was fined twice in 2018 due to a different contamination in Apple Sidra products which violates the Act Governing Food Safety and Sanitation. They were fined NT$ 1,000,000 in November 2018 and NT$ 1,200,000 in December 2018.

References 

Taiwanese brands
Soft drinks
Drink brands
Apple drinks
Products introduced in 1963
Taiwanese drinks